Andrew Dewey Kirk (May 28, 1898 – December 11, 1992) was an American jazz saxophonist and tubist who led the Twelve Clouds of Joy, a band popular during the swing era.

He was born in Newport, Kentucky, United States. Kirk grew up in Denver, Colorado, where he was tutored by Wilberforce Whiteman, Paul Whiteman's father. Kirk started his musical career playing with George Morrison's band, but then went on to join Terrence Holder's Dark Clouds of Joy. In 1929, he was elected leader after Holder departed. Renaming the band Clouds of Joy, Kirk also relocated the band from Dallas, Texas, to Kansas City, Missouri. Although named the Clouds of Joy, the band has also been known as the Twelve Clouds of Joy due to the number of musicians in the band. They set up in the Pla-Mor Ballroom on the junction of 32nd and Main in Kansas City and made their first recording for Brunswick Records that same year. Mary Lou Williams came in as pianist at the last moment, but she impressed Brunswick's Dave Kapp, so she became a member of the band.

After their first recordings in 1929–1930, they grew popular as they epitomized the Kansas City jazz sound. In mid-1936, he was signed to Decca and made scores of popular records until 1946. He presumably disbanded and reformed his band during that six-year recording layoff, as his 1929–1930 Brunswick appeared to have sold well enough to stay in the catalog through the period and 1933-34 pressings (with the mid-1930s label variations) have been seen.

In 1938, Kirk and band held the top spot of the Billboard chart for 12 weeks with "I Won't Tell a Soul (I Love You)", written by Hughie Charles and Ross Parker, featuring Pha Terrell on vocals. In 1942, Kirk and His Clouds of Joy recorded "Take It and Git", which on October 24, 1942, became the first single to hit number one on the Harlem Hit Parade, the predecessor to the Billboard R&B chart. In 1943, with June Richmond on vocals, he had a number 4 hit with "Hey Lawdy Mama".

Clouds of Joy 
The band at various times included Buddy Tate (tenor saxophone), Claude Williams (violin), Pha Terrell (vocals), Mary Lou's then husband, John Williams, Bill Coleman, Ken Kersey, Dick Wilson, Don Byas, "Shorty" Baker, Howard McGhee, Jimmy Forrest, Ben Smith, Fats Navarro, Charlie Parker (briefly), Reuben Phillips, Ben Thigpen, Henry Wells, Milt Robinson, Floyd Smith, Hank Jones, Johnny Lynch, Joe Williams, Big Jim Lawson, Gino Murray and Joe Evans.

Their pianist, and the band's arranger, was Mary Lou Williams, who went on to become a prominent figure in jazz.

In 1948, Kirk disbanded the Clouds of Joy and continued to work as a musician, but eventually switched to hotel management and real estate. He also served as an official in the Musicians' Union.

Death
He died of Alzheimer's disease in New York at the age of 94.

Discography
 Andy Kirk And His Clouds Of Joy: Souvenir Album, Vol. 1 (recorded 1936–1941) (Coral #56019 [10" LP], 1951)
 A Mellow Bit Of Rhythm (recorded 1956; re-recordings of 12 of his hits; album reissued as Clouds From The Southwest) (RCA Victor #1302 [LP], 1956; reissue: RCA France #42418 [LP], 1979)
 Clouds Of Joy (recorded 1930) (Ace Of Hearts #105 [LP], 1966)
 Twelve Clouds Of Joy (recorded 193?) (Ace Of Hearts #160 [LP], 1967)
 Instrumentally Speaking (1936–1942) [Andy Kirk & His Clouds Of Joy #1/Jazz Heritage Series #16] (Decca #79232 [LP], 1968; MCA France #510033 [LP] 197?; reissue: MCA #1308 [LP], 1980)
 Andy Kirk & His 12 Clouds Of Joy: March 1936 (Mainstream #399 [LP], 1973)
 The Lady Who Swings The Band (1936–1938) [Andy Kirk & His Clouds Of Joy #2/Jazz Heritage Series #70] (MCA France #510121 [LP], 1975; reissue: MCA #1343 [LP], 1982)
 Clouds At Sundown (1938–1942) [Andy Kirk & His Clouds Of Joy #3/Jazz Heritage Series #74] (MCA France #510133 [LP], 1975)
 The Best Of Andy Kirk (recorded 1936–1954) (MCA #4105 [2-LP set], 1976)
 Walkin' & Swingin'  (recorded 1936–1941) (Affinity #1011 [LP], 1983)
 Cloudy (recorded 1929–1930) (Hep #1002 [LP], 1984)
 All Out For Hicksville (recorded 1930–1931) (Hep #1007 [LP], 1985)
 The Uncollected Andy Kirk And The Clouds Of Joy: 1944 (Hindsight #227 [LP], 1986)
 Kansas City Bounce 1936–1940 (Black & Blue #59.240, 1991)
 The Chronological Andy Kirk And His 12 Clouds Of Joy 1929–1931 (Classics #655, 1992)
 The Chronological Andy Kirk And His 12 Clouds Of Joy 1936–1937 (Classics #573, 1991)
 The Chronological Andy Kirk And His 12 Clouds Of Joy 1937–1938 (Classics #581, 1991)
 The Chronological Andy Kirk And His 12 Clouds Of Joy 1938 (Classics #598, 1991)
 The Chronological Andy Kirk And His 12 Clouds Of Joy 1939–1940 (Classics #640, 1992)
 The Chronological Andy Kirk And His Clouds Of Joy 1940–1942 (Classics #681, 1993)
 The Chronological Andy Kirk And His Orchestra 1943–1949 (Classics #1075, 2000)
 Andy Kirk & Mary Lou Williams: Mary's Idea (recorded 1936–1937, and 1939–1941) (GRP #622, 1993)
 Andy Kirk: The 12 Clouds Of Joy With Mary Lou Williams (recorded 1929–1940) (ASV Living Era #5108, 1993)
 An Introduction To Andy Kirk: His Best Recordings 1929–1946 (Best Of Jazz #4053, 1996)
 Jukebox Hits 1936–1949 (Acrobat #4077, 2005)

See also
Kansas City Jazz
Mary Lou Williams

Notes

References
Andy Kirk, Twenty Years on Wheels. As Told to Amy Lee. Ann Arbor: University of Michigan Press, 1989.
Frank Driggs & Chuck Haddix, Kansas City Jazz: From Ragtime to Bebop – A History. Oxford: Oxford University, Oxford 2005;

External links
 Andy Kirk recordings at the Discography of American Historical Recordings.

1898 births
1992 deaths
Big band bandleaders
Swing tubists
Swing bandleaders
American jazz bandleaders
American jazz bass saxophonists
American male saxophonists
American jazz tubists
American male jazz musicians
20th-century American conductors (music)
20th-century American saxophonists
20th-century American male musicians
Hep Records artists
GRP Records artists
Deaths from Alzheimer's disease